American School is an international school in David, Chiriquí. It serves levels Pre-kindergarten through Grade 12.

References

External links

 American School

International schools in Panama